Dichomeris sandycitis is a moth in the family Gelechiidae. It was described by Edward Meyrick in 1907. It is found in China (Hong Kong) and India.

The wingspan is 14–16.5 mm. The forewings are brown except for a dark brown area along the distal one-fourth of the costal margin and termen. The markings are red, consisting of a triangular spot near the base across the fold, a slightly S-shaped stripe at two-thirds, large spots at two-fifths and two-thirds of the cell, as well as at two-thirds and below one-third of the fold. There is also a slightly arched fascia from the costal three-fourths to near the tornus, with a short yellow streak on the inside anteriorly. The hindwings are greyish brown.

References

Moths described in 1907
sandycitis